The women's tournament was one of two handball tournaments at the 1980 Summer Olympics. It was the second appearance of a women's handball tournament at the Olympic Games.

Qualification

Results

Top goalscorers

Team rosters

References

Women's tournament
Women's events at the 1980 Summer Olympics